38 Squadron or 38th Squadron may refer to:

 No. 38 Squadron RAAF, a unit of the Royal Australian Air Force
 No. 38 Squadron RAF, a unit of the United Kingdom Royal Air Force
 38th Bombardment Squadron, a unit of the United States Air Force
 38th Expeditionary Airlift Squadron, a unit of the United States Air Force
 38th Rescue Squadron, a unit of the United States Air Force
 38th Reconnaissance Squadron, a unit of the United States Air Force
 38th Tactical Reconnaissance Squadron, a unit of the United States Air Force
 38th Troop Carrier Squadron, a unit of the United States Army Air Forces
 Marine Wing Communications Squadron 38, a unit of the United States Marine Corps
 Marine Tactical Air Command Squadron 38, a unit of the United States Marine Corps

See also
 38th Division (disambiguation)
 38th Brigade (disambiguation)
 38th Regiment (disambiguation)
 38th Wing (disambiguation)